The canton of Bayeux is an administrative division of the Calvados department, northwestern France. Its borders were modified at the French canton reorganisation which came into effect in March 2015. Its seat is in Bayeux.

Composition

It consists of the following communes:

 Agy
 Arganchy
 Barbeville
 Bayeux
 Campigny
 Chouain 
 Commes
 Condé-sur-Seulles 
 Cottun
 Cussy
 Ellon 
 Esquay-sur-Seulles 
 Guéron
 Juaye-Mondaye
 Longues-sur-Mer 
 Magny-en-Bessin
 Le Manoir
 Manvieux
 Monceaux-en-Bessin
 Nonant
 Port-en-Bessin-Huppain 
 Ranchy
 Ryes
 Saint-Loup-Hors
 Saint-Martin-des-Entrées
 Saint-Vigor-le-Grand
 Sommervieu
 Subles
 Sully
 Tracy-sur-Mer
 Vaucelles
 Vaux-sur-Aure
 Vaux-sur-Seulles
 Vienne-en-Bessin

Councillors

Pictures of the canton

References

Bayeux